Rock and Roll Bye Bye is the second studio album from American rock band Skaters. It was released on March 24, 2017 under their own label, Yonks Records.

Track listing

References

2017 albums
Skaters (band) albums
Yonks Records albums